Teleiodes klaussattleri is a moth of the family Gelechiidae. It is found in Korea.

The wingspan is 15–16 mm. The forewing colour and markings are similar to Teleiodes paraluculella, but the central yellowish-orange on the discal cell is rather dull. Adults are on wing from the end of May to early June.

References

Moths described in 1992
Teleiodes